is a Japanese romance yuri manga series written and illustrated by Milk Morinaga and serialized in Comic High! by Futabasha. It's published in English by Seven Seas Entertainment.

Plot 
Police officer Sasami Aoba is assigned to enter an all girls High School as an undercover cop to monitor for any suspicious activity, but when she arrives there she discovers that there is already another officer assigned to the school. Sakuraba Midori is her name, and the two of them are forced to become partners and watch over the school together.

Characters
Sasami Aoba
Since a young age Aoba always wanted to be a police officer, and she takes her job of protecting the school very seriously, helping students resolve problems no matter how small they are. She is a novice officer, so she frequently makes mistakes and bends the rules.

Sakuraba Midori
Midori is a more experienced officer who was assigned to the school by her overprotective father. She is strict and frequently gets annoyed by Aoba's behaviour.

Manga

Reception
On Anime News Network, Rebecca Silverman, in a review of volume 1, said the series is "clearly going to get better and on par with Morinaga's other works, but as a start, it's slow and a little confusing". Erica Friedman gave volume 1 an overall rating of 8, and called it "a solid beginning to something completely different from Morinaga Milk-sensei".

References

External links

Futabasha manga
Lesbian-related comics
Romance anime and manga
Seinen manga
Seven Seas Entertainment titles
Yuri (genre) anime and manga